Siryee "Othello" Bah (born 27 April 1995) is a former Liberian footballer who played his entire career in the United States, and made a single appearance for the Liberian national team.

Career

College
Bah played college soccer at Tennessee Wesleyan University for three seasons, before transferring to Nova Southeastern University in 2017.

Semi-professional & Professional
Bah played in the NPSL with Chattanooga FC between 2015 and 2017 while also playing in college. He later played with Miami FC in both their NPSL and NISA seasons in 2019. He continued with the club as they moved to the USL Championship in 2020. On 27 September 2022, Bah announced his decision to retire from playing professional football.

International career
Bah made his Liberia national football team debut on June 17, 2021 in a 5-1 loss to Algeria.

Career Statistics

References

External links
 

1995 births
Living people
Liberian footballers
Liberia international footballers
Liberian expatriate footballers
Liberian expatriate sportspeople in the United States
Expatriate soccer players in the United States
Association football forwards
Nova Southeastern Sharks men's soccer players
Chattanooga FC players
Miami FC players
National Premier Soccer League players
USL Championship players
National Independent Soccer Association players
People from Montserrado County
Tennessee Wesleyan Bulldogs men's soccer players